The Old Holy Redeemer Catholic Church is a historic site in Kissimmee, Florida. It is located at 120 North Sproule Avenue. On January 3, 1994, it was added to the U.S. National Register of Historic Places.

This church had its early services in the home of Mrs. A. Tress, above the Tress Store on Broadway. It was once a mission of Orlando's St. James Catholic Church. On May 5, 1912, they laid the cornerstone of a little brick church at 122 W. Sproule Ave., and celebrated their first mass there on June 30, 1912. It cost $7,000, and initially had no pews and no electricity. In 1972, they sold the building for $85,000 to the First United Methodist Church. The present building on this site was completed in 1973.

References

External links

 Osceola County listings at National Register of Historic Places
 Florida's Office of Cultural and Historical Programs
 Osceola County listings
 Old Holy Redeemer Catholic Church

Churches on the National Register of Historic Places in Florida
Churches in Osceola County, Florida
Buildings and structures in Kissimmee, Florida
Former Roman Catholic church buildings in Florida
National Register of Historic Places in Osceola County, Florida
1912 establishments in Florida